Clarksville is a town located in Allegany County, New York, United States. As of the 2020 census, the town had a total population of 982. The town is named after S.N. Clark, an agent of the Holland Land Company.

The town is in the southwest part of Allegany County, northeast of Olean.

History 
The first settlers arrived around 1822. The town of Clarksville was founded in 1835, taking away part of the town of Cuba.

Geography

The west town line is the border of Cattaraugus County.

New York State Route 305 is an important north-south highway through the town.

Demographics

As of the census of 2000, there were 1,146 people, 447 households, and 324 families residing in the town.  The population density was 31.6 people per square mile (12.2/km2).  There were 766 housing units at an average density of 21.1 per square mile (8.2/km2).  The racial makeup of the town was 98.34% White, 0.17% African American, 0.26% Native American, 0.35% Asian, 0.00% Pacific Islander, 0.17% from other races, and 0.70% from two or more races.  0.17% of the population were Hispanic or Latino of any race.

There were 447 households, out of which 32.7% had children under the age of 18 living with them, 59.1% were married couples living together, 8.1% had a female householder with no husband present, and 27.3% were non-families. 20.8% of all households were made up of individuals, and 8.7% had someone living alone who was 65 years of age or older.  The average household size was 2.56 and the average family size was 2.96.

In the town, the population was spread out, with 26.1% under the age of 18, 6.6% from 18 to 24, 27.4% from 25 to 44, 26.4% from 45 to 64, and 13.5% who were 65 years of age or older.  The median age was 39 years. For every 100 females, there were 100.7 males.  For every 100 females age 18 and over, there were 101.2 males.

The median income for a household in the town was $29,931, and the median income for a family was $35,000. Males had a median income of $29,917 versus $20,000 for females. The per capita income for the town was $13,931.  14.4% of the population and 11.1% of families were below the poverty line.   20.7% of those under the age of 18 and 10.6% of those 65 and older were living below the poverty line.

Communities and locations in the Town of Clarksville 
Dodge Creek – A stream in the central part of the town, passing near West Clarksville and paralleling NY 305.
Germantown – A location in the northwest corner of the town.
North Clarkstown – A former location in the town.
Obi – A hamlet on NY 305 (Obi Road)  near the south town line.
West Clarksville – A hamlet by the junction of County Route 40 (Jordan Hill Road) and NY 305 (Portville Road) near the town center.
Wolf Creek – A stream in the west part of the town.

References

External links
  Historical note on Clarksville, NY

Towns in Allegany County, New York
1835 establishments in New York (state)